Jordan A. Patterson (born February 12, 1992) is an American former professional baseball outfielder and first baseman. He has played in Major League Baseball (MLB) for the Colorado Rockies.

Amateur career
At Baker High School in Mobile County, Alabama, Patterson played four years of baseball, football and basketball. As a senior, he had a 1.63 earned run average and hit .439 with 17 extra-base hits and eight stolen bases.

Patterson initially intended to accept a scholarship to play college baseball at Mississippi Gulf Coast Community College but changed his commitment to the University of South Alabama shortly before the fall semester began. In 2012, he played collegiate summer baseball with the Bourne Braves of the Cape Cod Baseball League. As a junior, he was the Sun Belt Conference Player of the Year.

Professional career

Colorado Rockies
He was drafted by the Colorado Rockies in the fourth round of the 2013 Major League Baseball draft. He made his professional debut with the Grand Junction Rockies and spent 2014 with the Asheville Tourists. Patterson started 2015 with Modesto Nuts and was promoted to the Double-A New Britain Rock Cats in July. During the final month of the season he transitioned into a first baseman. Patterson was promoted to the Major Leagues on September 6, 2016. He was designated for assignment by the Rockies on November 20, 2018.

New York Mets/Cincinnati Reds/Toronto Blue Jays
On November 26, 2018 Patterson was claimed off waivers by the New York Mets. Three days later he was claimed by the Cincinnati Reds. The next day he was non-tendered and became a free agent. On December 4, he re-signed to a minor league deal with the Reds. On March 27, 2019, Patterson was traded to the Toronto Blue Jays. He became a free agent following the 2019 season.

Chicago Cubs
On February 23, 2020, Patterson signed a minor league deal with the Chicago Cubs. Patterson was released by the Cubs organization on May 28, 2020.

Fargo-Moorhead RedHawks
On July 12, 2020, Patterson signed with the Fargo-Moorhead RedHawks of the American Association of Independent Professional Baseball. He was released on July 31, 2020.

References

External links

1992 births
Living people
Sportspeople from Mobile, Alabama
Baseball players from Alabama
Major League Baseball outfielders
Colorado Rockies players
South Alabama Jaguars baseball players
Bourne Braves players
Grand Junction Rockies players
Asheville Tourists players
Modesto Nuts players
New Britain Rock Cats players
Salt River Rafters players
Albuquerque Isotopes players
Buffalo Bisons (minor league) players
Águilas Cibaeñas players
American expatriate baseball players in the Dominican Republic